Wellsville Municipal Airport , also known as Tarantine Field, is a public use airport located  southwest of Wellsville, a village in the Town of Wellsville, Allegany County, New York, United States. The airport is owned by the Town of Wellsville. It is included in the National Plan of Integrated Airport Systems for 2011–2015, which categorized it as a general aviation facility.

The original northwest/southeast runway is still clearly visible.

Facilities and aircraft 

The west-facing runway is equipped with a localizer instrument approach and a medium intensity approach lighting system which allows for a small improvement in landing minimums.

For the 12-month period ending July 31, 2012, the airport had 9,350 aircraft operations, an average of 25 per day: 91% general aviation, 8% air taxi, and 1% military. At that time there were 21 aircraft based at this airport: 81% single-engine and 19% multi-engine.

References

External links 
 Wellsville Municipal Airport (ELZ) at NYSDOT Airport Directory
 Aerial image as of April 1994 from USGS The National Map
 

Airports in New York (state)
Transportation in Allegany County, New York